CJLD-FM (93.1 FM, 93.1 The One) is a country formatted radio station licensed to Leduc, Alberta, Canada, serving Leduc County. CJLD is owned by Mark Tamagi and operated by Blackgold Broadcasting Inc.

History
On February 22, 2012, the Canadian Radio-television and Telecommunications Commission (CRTC) approved an application for Mark Tamagi, on behalf of Blackgold Broadcasting Inc., to operate a new English language FM radio station in Leduc.  

At 9:31am, on April 16, 2013, 93.1 The One officially launched with "Roughest Neck Around" by Corb Lund and the Hurtin' Albertans as the station's first song.

Programming
The station's programming schedule consists of local DJs Steve Bohan, Al Stafford & Jayson Shermack. The nationally syndicated Intelligence for Your Life with John Tesh and The Hit List with Fitz round out the schedule.

References

External links
 93.1 The One
 
 

2013 establishments in Alberta
JLD-FM
Leduc, Alberta
Radio stations established in 2013
JLD-FM